Bellemonte, also known as Dr. John F. Bellamy House, is a historic plantation house located at Rocky Mount, Nash County, North Carolina.  The main block dates to 1817, and is a two-story, five-bay, late Georgian / Federal-style frame dwelling.

The façade features a two-tier, Chippendale-inspired portico. The house has a two-story rear ell, built about 1820, that was attached to Bellemonte between 1840 and 1860.  Also on the property is a contributing dependency.

Bellemonte was listed on the National Register of Historic Places in 1989. It now houses the Marketing Dept as well as offers events by North Carolina Wesleyan College.

References

Plantation houses in North Carolina
Houses on the National Register of Historic Places in North Carolina
Georgian architecture in North Carolina
Federal architecture in North Carolina
Houses completed in 1817
Houses in Nash County, North Carolina
National Register of Historic Places in Nash County, North Carolina